Gilbert Horton (c.1840 - July 1894) was an American politician who served as a justice of the peace and a state legislator in Mississippi. A Republican, he served in the Mississippi House of Representatives in 1884 and 1885.

Horton lived in Greenville, Mississippi with his wife Matilda.

The 1894 Republican Party convention in Vicksburg commemorated him upon announcement of his death.

See also
African-American officeholders during and following the Reconstruction era

References

Republican Party members of the Mississippi House of Representatives
19th-century African-American people
1840 births
1894 deaths